Kelly Services, Inc. (formerly Russell Kelly Office Service and Kelly Girl Service, Inc.) is an American office staffing company that operates globally. The company places employees at all levels in various sectors including financial services, information technology, and law. Also, its professional services include human resource and management consulting, outsourcing, recruitment, career transition, and vendor management. Kelly Services was founded by William Russell Kelly in 1946 and is headquartered in Troy, Michigan.

History 
Founded in 1946 by William Russell Kelly, the company was originally named Russell Kelly Office Service.  Services were provided in-house at the Kelly office. However, as customer offices grew and needed more resources, they began to ask for the Kelly employees to perform the work at their own offices. Temporary workers from Russell Kelly Office Service soon became known as ‘Kelly Girls’. Adelaide Hess Moran, the first Kelly temporary employee to work at a customer’s office was promptly dubbed the first ‘Kelly Girl’.

The temporary workers, usually female, became known as "Kelly girls", and the company name was changed to Kelly Girl Service, Inc. in 1957. Eventually "Kelly girl" became a widely used term for a temporary worker, regardless of company affiliation or gender.  By 1966, the company had expanded to include industrial and technical services divisions and was renamed Kelly Services, Inc.

In 2008, Lynn Noyes was awarded $6.5 million in damages from Kelly Services for failing to promote her because she was not part of the Fellowship of Friends cult.

In 2015, the company reported 8,100 employees, $5.5 billion in revenue, making it one of the world's largest staffing firms. In 2018, the company reported $5.5 billion in revenue.

, the CEO is Peter Quigley.

See also

 ManpowerGroup

References

External links
 Official company website

Companies listed on the Nasdaq
Companies based in Troy, Michigan
Business services companies established in 1946
Management consulting firms of the United States
Human resource management consulting firms
Temporary employment agencies
Employment agencies of the United States
1946 establishments in Michigan